Anthidium jocosum is a species of bee in the family Megachilidae, the leaf-cutter, carder, or mason bees.

Synonyms
Synonyms for this species include:
Anthidium xanthognathum Cockerell, 1925
Anthidium fontis Cockerell, 1925

References

External links
Anatomical illustrations

jocosum
Insects described in 1878
Taxa named by Ezra Townsend Cresson